Danny, the Champion of the World, or simply Danny, is a 1975 children's book by Roald Dahl. The plot centres on Danny, a young English boy, and his father, William. They live in a Gypsy caravan, fix cars for a living in their mechanic shop and partake in poaching pheasants. It was first published on February 14, 1975 in the United States by Alfred A. Knopf, Inc. and in the United Kingdom by Jonathan Cape.

It was adapted into a made-for-TV movie in 1989 by Thames Television which starred Jeremy Irons as William and Robbie Coltrane as Mr Victor Hazell. The novel is based on Dahl's adult short story "The Champion of the World" which first appeared in print in The New Yorker magazine, as did some of the other short stories that would later be reprinted as Kiss Kiss (1960). 

The actor Peter Serafinowicz provides an English language audiobook recording. Time magazine included the novel in its list of the 100 Best Young-Adult Books of All Time.

Summary 
Danny, who was born in the mid-1960s, was only four months old when his mother died suddenly. He is an only child. At the beginning of the book, he lives with his father, William, in an old caravan behind the service station and garage owned and operated by his father in the south of England. Danny and his father are very close and share pastimes like building and flying kites, fire balloons, and go-karts. William is also an excellent storyteller and a version of The BFG is told to Danny as a bedtime story. The father and son have generally idyllic times despite not having much.

Mr. Victor Hazell is an  unpleasant, wealthy local nouveau riche gentleman and beer magnate who lives in a nearby mansion and had been to their filling station and threatened Danny with a hiding if there were fingerprints found on his silver Rolls-Royce. At the age of nine, Danny learns that his father was an avid poacher, as was his late grandfather before him, after discovering his absence in the middle of the night and being faced with a long wait for him to return home. Danny's father has been poaching in the local woods which are owned by Victor Hazell.

A short time afterwards, Danny wakes at 02:10 to find his father hasn't returned from his latest poaching venture on Hazell's property. Danny nervously borrows an Austin 7 which has been repaired at their garage to drive to the property and search for his father. Danny, unaware that the keepers depart after sunset, sneaks through the woods where he finds his father incapacitated by a suspected broken ankle in a trap intended for humans. Danny rescues his father and drives him back home.

While his father recovers from his injury, he and Danny realise Mr. Hazell's annual pheasant shoot is approaching - an event to which he invites wealthy, powerful and influential aristocrats from across the south of England. Danny and his father decide to humiliate Hazell by poaching all the pheasants in the forest just before the self-aggrandising hunt. To accomplish this, they sew the contents of the sleeping pills prescribed to Danny's father by the village doctor, Doc Spencer, into raisins that the pheasants will eat; Danny's father calls this new method "Sleeping Beauty". After having successfully captured 120 pheasants from Hazell's Wood, Danny and his father take a taxi driven by Charlie Kinch (a fellow poacher) to the local vicarage, where they hide the pheasants. Afterwards, they walk home.

The next day, the vicar's wife (Mrs. Clipstone) delivers the sleeping pheasants to Danny's father's garage in a specially built baby carriage; however, the pheasants start flying out of the baby carriage as the soporific wears off. The birds do not travel far, as they're still sleepy. During the commotion, Mr. Hazell arrives and in a sputtering rage, confronts Danny, his father and Doc Spencer, accusing them of stealing his pheasants. With the help of Sergeant Enoch Samways, the village policeman, Danny and his father shoo the stunned pheasants over (and in some cases inside) Mr. Hazell's Rolls-Royce, damaging the car's paintwork in the process. As Mr. Hazell leaves disgraced, many of the pheasants wake up completely and fly away in the opposite direction from Hazell's property. The book ends when Danny is hailed as "the champion of the world" by his father, Doc Spencer and Sgt. Samways. Six pheasants died of a sleeping pill overdose, so Doc Spencer gives two each to Sergeant Samways, Mrs Clipstone and Danny and his father. Danny and his father then walk into town, intending to buy a new oven from Mr Wheeler to roast their pheasants. They also discuss possibly attempting to poach trout from a local stream.

The book ends with a plea to the child who has just finished reading the story, that when they are grown up with children of their own, they be as exciting a parent to them as William was to Danny.

TV movie 

The book was adapted into a made-for-TV movie in 1989 by Thames Television. It was directed by Gavin Millar and starred Jeremy Irons as William Smith, and his son, Samuel Irons, as the titular character, Danny Smith, with Robbie Coltrane as Mr. Hazell. It was released to Region 2 DVD in 2006.

Relations to other Roald Dahl books
Danny, The Champion of the World is based on a previous short story by Dahl, entitled The Champion of the World, which was first published in The New Yorker Magazine in 1959 and later re-published in the compilation Kiss Kiss. The original story has a similar premise, but with adults as the main characters.

William tells Danny a bedtime story sequence of a "Big Friendly Giant" who captures good dreams and blows them into children's bedrooms at night. Dahl would later use the same concept in the full-length novel The BFG.

Danny describes being caned by his teacher, Captain Lancaster, for cheating in an exam. This is similar to an experience that Dahl recounted of his own teacher, Captain Hardcastle, in Boy: Tales of Childhood.

Editions
  (hardback, 1975)
  (paperback, 1977)
  (paperback, 1988)
  (hardback, 1994)
  (paperback, 1994)
  (paperback, 2002)
  (hardback, 2002)
  (library binding, 2002)
  (hardback, 2004)

References

1975 British novels
Children's books by Roald Dahl
Roald Dahl characters
Novels by Roald Dahl
British children's novels
Jonathan Cape books
British novels adapted into films
1975 children's books